Lebanese Option Party is a Lebanese secular and an economically liberal party, which is also a predominantly Shia political movement established in 2007. It is headed by Ahmad Kamel Asaad, the son of the former speaker of the Lebanese Parliament Kamel El-Assaad and the grandson of the former speaker of the Parliament Ahmad El-Assaad.

Lebanese Option strongly protests the political  hegemony of the two movements Hezbollah and Amal Movement on the Shi'ite community in Lebanon. Its platform is more in line with the Lebanese majority March 14 Alliance and greatly opposed to mainstream Shi'ite movements allied with the March 8 Alliance, namely Hezbollah and Amal Movement. But the Lebanese Option is not an official part of the March 14 Alliance and keeps an independent secular status.

In early June 2013, a Lebanese Option activist, and head of the party's student wing Hashem Salman was shot dead during a protest outside the Iranian Embassy in Beirut. The protest, organized by the LOP, criticized Hezbollah's involvement in the Syrian Civil War. In mid-October 2013, its leader, Ahmad El-Assaad, called for Lebanon to cut ties with Bashar al-Assad's government and the expulsion of its ambassador.

References

External links
Official website of Lebanese Option Party

2007 establishments in Lebanon
Islamic political parties in Lebanon
Liberal parties in Lebanon
Political parties established in 2007
Secularism in Lebanon